Carabus obsoletus is a species of black-coloured beetle from family Carabidae, found in Czech Republic, Hungary, Moldova, Romania, Slovakia, Ukraine.

Subspecies
Carabus obsoletus carpathicus
Carabus obsoletus fossulifer
Carabus obsoletus nagyagensis 
Carabus obsoletus obsoletus
Carabus obsoletus prunneri
Carabus obsoletus uhligi

References

External links
Image of a beetle

obsoletus
Beetles described in 1815
Beetles of Europe